The India national football team has participated in nine editions of FIFA World Cup qualification. This is the complete list of all the nation's matches played, along with records against each opponent.

Summary

Tournaments

1986 FIFA World Cup qualification (AFC)

East Asia Zone

Group 3B

Source:RSSSF

1994 FIFA World Cup qualification (AFC)
Group D

1998 FIFA World Cup qualification (AFC)
Group 10

2002 FIFA World Cup qualification (AFC)

First round
Group 8

2006 FIFA World Cup qualification (AFC)

Second round
Group 3

2010 FIFA World Cup qualification (AFC)

First round

|}

Lebanon won 6 – 3 on aggregate and advanced to the Third Round.

2014 FIFA World Cup qualification (AFC)

Second round

|}

United Arab Emirates won 5–2 on aggregate and advanced to the Third Round.

2018 FIFA World Cup qualification (AFC)

First round

|}

India won 2–0 on aggregate and advanced to the second round.

Second round

Group D

2022 FIFA World Cup qualification

Second round

 All matches since 19 November 2019 were played in a centralised venue due to the COVID-19 pandemic in Asia
 Also all matches were resheduled from their original dates.

Group E

Statistics

Results by opponent
India has played against 21 different nations during FIFA World Cup qualification.
Matches played from the 1986 edition to the 1994 edition had been provided with 2 points for a win, 1 for a draw and 0 for a loss.
Matches played thereafter have been provided with 3 points for a win, 1 for a draw and 0 for a loss.
This is the performance table as of 15 June 2021.

 2022 qualification opponents<noinclude>

Notes

See also 

History of the India national football team
India national football team at the Olympics
India at the AFC Asian Cup

References

India national football team